Artocarpus dadah is a tree species in the genus Artocarpus found in Myanmar to W. Malesia including Sumatra. It is of pacific origin and is a species of the Mulberry family, Moraceae.

Chemical composition
The chemical compounds oxyresveratrol, (+)-catechin, afzelechin-3-O-alpha-L-rhamnopyranoside, (−)-epiafzelechin, dihydromorin, epiafzelechin-(4beta→8)-epicatechin, dadahol A and dadahol B, resveratrol, steppogenin, moracin M, isogemichalcone B, gemichalcone B, norartocarpetin and engeletin can be found in A. dadah.

References

External links

dadah
Flora of Indo-China
Flora of Malesia
Plants described in 1861
Taxa named by Friedrich Anton Wilhelm Miquel